The Juno Award for "Instrumental Album of the Year" has been awarded since 1976, as recognition each year for the best instrumental album in Canada.  The award was originally called the "Instrumental Artist of the Year".

Winners

Instrumental Artist(s) of the Year (1976 - 1987)
1976 - Hagood Hardy
1977 - Hagood Hardy
1978 - André Gagnon
1979 - Liona Boyd
1980 - Frank Mills
1981 - Frank Mills
1982 - Liona Boyd
1983 - Liona Boyd
1984 - Liona Boyd
1985 - Canadian Brass
1986 - David Foster
1987 - David Foster

Instrumental Artist(s) of the Year (1989 - 1998)
1989 - David Foster
1990 - Manteca
1991 - Ofra Harnoy
1992 - Shadowy Men on a Shadowy Planet
1993 - Ofra Harnoy
1994 - Ofra Harnoy
1995 - André Gagnon
1996 - Liona Boyd
1997 - Ashley MacIsaac
1998 - Leahy

Best Instrumental Album (1999 - 2002)
2000 - Natalie MacMaster, In My Hands
2001 - Jesse Cook, Free Fall
2002 - Oscar Lopez, Armando's Fire

Instrumental Album of the Year (2003 - Present)
2003 - Robert Michaels, Allegro
2004 - I Sorenti, Italian Love Songs
2005 - Oscar Lopez, Mi Destino/My Destiny
2006 - Daniel Lanois, Belladonna
2007 - Sisters Euclid, Run Neil Run
2008 - Jayme Stone, The Utmost
2009 - DJ Brace, DJ Brace presents The Electric Nosehair Orchestra, Nostomania
2010 - Bell Orchestre, As Seen Through The Windows
2011 - Fond of Tigers, Continent & Western
2012 - Stretch Orchestra, Stretch Orchestra
2013 - Pugs and Crows, Fantastic Pictures
2014 - Esmerine, Dalmak
2015 - Quartango, Encuentro
2016 - Colin Stetson and Sarah Neufeld, Never Were the Way She Was
2017 - The Fretless, Bird's Nest
2018 - Do Make Say Think, Stubborn Persistent Illusions
2019 - Gordon Grdina, China Cloud
2020 - Alexandra Stréliski, Inscape
2021 - Blitz//Berlin, Movements III
2022 - David Myles, That Tall Distance
2023 - Esmerine, Everything Was Forever Until It Was No More

References

Instrumental Album
Album awards